Nami (('wave'),  ('regular'), etc.) may refer to:

Given name
 Nami, Japanese feminine given name
 Nami Akimoto (born 1968), Japanese manga artist
 , Japanese film director, screenwriter and editor
, Japanese judoka
 Nami Kurokawa (born 1980), Japanese voice actress
 Nami Miyazaki (born 1976), Japanese field hockey international goal keeper
 Nami Tamaki (born 1988), Japanese singer
 Nami Teshima (born 1974), Japanese retired judo wrestler
 Nami Tsukamoto (born 1979), Japanese ballet dancer and film actress
 Nami Yayak, Turkish Olympic fencer
 Na-mi (born 1957), South Korean singer

Surname
 Ahmed al-Nami (1977–2001), Saudi hijacker of United Airlines Flight 93
 Arsi Nami (born 1984), Iranian singer
 Kazutsugi Nami (born 1933), Japanese businessman
 Mohammad Nami, Saudi footballer

Characters
 Nami, one of the protagonists in the manga and anime series One Piece 
 Nami, a character and bachelorette in Harvest Moon: A Wonderful Life and Harvest Moon DS
 Nami Aoi, a character from the manga and anime series Aki Sora
 Nami Hito, a character in the manga and anime series Sayonara, Zetsubou-Sensei
 Nami Kusunoki, a character in the manga series Alive: The Final Evolution
 Nami Satō, a character from the visual novel Gift

Other uses
 Naminatha, 21st Jain Tirthankara
 Nami (film), 1952 Japanese film
 Namiseom, tiny half-moon shaped island located in Chuncheon, South Korea

Abbreviation
 National Alliance on Mental Illness
 North American Meat Institute
 Central Scientific Research Automobile and Automotive Engines Institute (NAMI), Russian scientific automotive institute

See also
 Namie (disambiguation)
 Name (disambiguation)
 Na Mi (disambiguation)
 Namy

Arabic-language surnames
Japanese feminine given names